Gran is an island in Nordanstig Municipality, Gävleborg County, Sweden.

Gran has an area of about 0.63 km2. It is about 10 km from the mainland. There are remains of an old fishing village. The island is included in a nature reserve established in 1988. The climate is lush and rich.

References 

Swedish islands in the Baltic
Islands of Gävleborg County